The 2010 Pennsylvania gubernatorial election was held on November 2, 2010, to elect the Governor and Lieutenant Governor of Pennsylvania, concurrently with elections to the United States Senate in Pennsylvania and other states and elections to the United States House of Representatives and various state and local elections. 

Incumbent Democratic Governor Ed Rendell was term-limited and thus ineligible to seek re-election in 2010. In the primary, Democrats nominated Allegheny County Chief Executive Dan Onorato, who defeated Pennsylvania Auditor General Jack Wagner, State Senator Anthony H. Williams and Montgomery County Commissioner Joe Hoeffel. Republicans nominated Pennsylvania Attorney General Tom Corbett, who defeated State Representative Sam Rohrer in the primary. In primary elections for lieutenant governor, which were held separately, H. Scott Conklin defeated Jonathan Saidel and Doris Smith-Ribner in the Democratic primary. Jim Cawley emerged from a nine-candidate field in the Republican primary. 

Corbett defeated Onorato in the November general election. As lieutenant gubernatorial nominees run on a joint ticket with the gubernatorial nominee of their respective parties in the general election in Pennsylvania, Cawley was elected lieutenant governor over Conklin. , this was the last time a Republican was elected Governor of Pennsylvania as well as the last time Allegheny County was carried by a Republican candidate. This is the only time a Republican has been elected governor of Pennsylvania in the 21st century.

Democratic primary

Candidates
 Dan Onorato, Allegheny County Chief Executive (from Pittsburgh)
 Jack Wagner, Auditor General (from Pittsburgh)
 Anthony Williams, State Senator (from Philadelphia)
 Joe Hoeffel, Montgomery County Commissioner and former U.S. Representative (from Abington Township, Montgomery County)

Dropped Out
 Chris Doherty, Mayor of Scranton
 Tom Knox, healthcare executive (from Philadelphia)

Polling

Results

Republican primary

Candidates
 Tom Corbett, Attorney General (from Shaler Township)
 Sam Rohrer, State Representative (from Robeson Township)

Dropped Out
 Jim Gerlach, U.S Representative
 Pat Meehan, Former United States Attorney for the Eastern District of Pennsylvania (Ran for and won race for U.S Representative from Pennsylvania's 7th congressional district)

Polling

Results

General election

Candidates
 Tom Corbett (R), Pennsylvania Attorney General
 Dan Onorato (D), Allegheny County Executive

Predictions

Polling

Results

See also
2010 Pennsylvania lieutenant gubernatorial election
2010 United States Senate election in Pennsylvania
2010 United States gubernatorial elections

References

External links
Pennsylvania Department of State
Official election results
Official general information for voting, no candidate lists
Pennsylvania Governor Candidates at Project Vote Smart
Campaign contributions for 2010 Pennsylvania Governor from Follow the Money
2010 Pennsylvania Governor General Election: All Head-to-Head Matchups graph of multiple polls from Pollster.com
Election 2010: Pennsylvania Governor from Rasmussen Reports
2010 Pennsylvania Governor Race from Real Clear Politics
2010 Pennsylvania Governor's Race from CQ Politics
Race Profile in The New York Times
Official campaign websites
Dan Onorato for Governor 
Tom Corbett for Governor 

Gubernatorial
2010
Pennsylvania